Marrowbone is a census-designated place in Cumberland County, Kentucky, United States. As of the 2010 census it had a population of 217. It has a post office, with the ZIP code of 42759.

The Marrowbone Historic District, which includes three properties, is listed on the National Register of Historic Places.

Geography
It lies along Kentucky Route 90 west of the city of Burkesville, the county seat of Cumberland County.

Demographics

References

Census-designated places in Cumberland County, Kentucky